Lumphat is a district in Ratanakiri Province, north-east Cambodia. In 1998, it had a population of 10,301.

Lomphat, the former capital of Ratanakiri, is located in the district on the Srepok River. The town is home to fewer than 800 people. The district gives its name to the Lomphat Wildlife Sanctuary, a preservation area for the many unique species indigenous to Northeast Cambodia.

Administration

The district is subdivided into six communes (khum), which are further subdivided into 26 villages (phum).

References

Districts of Ratanakiri province